Percy Stanbrook Evans (20 July 1894 – 17 January 1959) was a British-Indian English first-class cricketer who played five matches for Worcestershire in 1928.

Evans made a significant contribution, when on debut against Glamorgan he took 3-84, dismissing Dai Davies, Frank Ryan and Dennis Sullivan.
After that he never took another wicket in his professional career, and he never surpassed the 5 he scored in the first innings of that debut game.

Evans was also a gold medal-winning field hockey player, playing under captain Jaipal Singh Munda, winning a gold medal for India in the 1928 Summer Olympics in Amsterdam, Netherlands.

Notes

References
Percy Evans from CricketArchive

English cricketers
Worcestershire cricketers
1894 births
1959 deaths
British people in colonial India